Louis Pauteix (18 April 1883 – 11 February 1931) was a French long-distance runner. He competed at the International Cross Country Championships in 1910–1914 and won a team silver medal in 1913, placing fourth in 1911 and 1912. He took part in the marathon event at the 1912 Summer Olympics, but failed to finish.

References

1883 births
1931 deaths
French male long-distance runners
French male marathon runners
Olympic athletes of France
Athletes (track and field) at the 1912 Summer Olympics
People from Uzès
Sportspeople from Gard